Monna Vanna is a 1915 Italian silent film directed by Mario Caserini and starring Madeleine Céliat, Hamilton Revelle and François-Paul Donadio. It was released in the United States by Universal Pictures in 1916.

Cast
 Madeleine Céliat 
 Hamilton Revelle 
 François-Paul Donadio 
 Luigi Chiesa 
 Maria Caserini
 Cesare Zocchi 
 Umberto Scalpellini
 Rita Jolivet

See also
 Monna Vanna (1922)

References

Bibliography
 Aldo Bernardini & Vittorio Martinelli. Il cinema muto italiano, Volume 8, Part 2. Nuova ERI-Edizioni RAI, 1992.

External links

1915 films
1910s Italian-language films
Films directed by Mario Caserini
Italian silent short films
Films based on works by Maurice Maeterlinck
Films set in the 15th century
Italian black-and-white films